Rear Admiral Thomas H. Copeman III, Commandant of the Guantanamo Bay detention camps, ordered the posting of the official list of Guantanamo captives cleared in 2009.
During the last years of the Presidency of George W. Bush captives had annual reviews conducted by an Office for the Administrative Review of Detained Enemy Combatants.

On January 22, 2009, two days after President Barack Obama took office, he issued Executive Orders 13491, 13492 and 13493, all of which concerned how the United States should treat its captives.

The new policies superseded the older reviews, and included new, inter-agency reviews. President Obama announced plans to close the camps before January 22, 2010. According to the Associated Press and Reuters Admiral Copeman ordered the lists of captives who had been cleared for release to be posted to prevent the spread of rumors. Reuters reported the official list included 78 names. A further 17 captives have been repatriated or transferred since President Obama took office.



Nationality of Guantanamo captives cleared for release in 2009

Captives known to have been released, transferred or repatriated in 2009
Six captives left Guantanamo on January 17, 2009, four days before Barack Obama took office.

As of September 29, 2009 17 captives have been released, transferred or repatriated sing Barack Obama took office and reversed some policies of the George W. Bush Presidency. Some of these men were released, after a habeas corpus petition ruled that the USA was holding them illegally.
Other captive were not cleared of suspicion of playing a role that had threatened the USA, but were repatriated to their home country, or transferred to the custody of a third country, because they were determined to no longer pose a significant threat.

In addition a captive died while in the camp's psychiatric wing, and another captive was transferred to the USA to stand trial in civilian court.

References

2009 in Cuba
2009 in the United States
2009-related lists
Release 2009